Cirey-sur-Vezouze (literally Cirey on Vezouze) is a commune in the Meurthe-et-Moselle department in north-eastern France.

History
During the Second World War, a Royal Canadian Air Force Lancaster Bomber was forced to crash land near Cirey-sur-Vezouze after a bombing raid on Stuttgart. Three of the crew were killed in the crash landing with a further two airmen (including Flight Sergeant Fordham) being apprehended, taken into the nearby forest and summarily executed by German forces. Three war graves lay in Cirey-sur-Vezouze's graveyard, with the shallow graves in the forest being discovered and exhumed by a team led by Major Eric Barksworth.

See also
Communes of the Meurthe-et-Moselle department

References

Cireysurvezouze
Three Bishoprics